The Rio Grande Project is a United States Bureau of Reclamation irrigation, hydroelectricity, flood control, and interbasin water transfer project serving the upper Rio Grande basin in the southwestern United States. The project irrigates  along the river in the states of New Mexico and Texas. Approximately 60 percent of this land is in New Mexico. The project was authorized in 1905, but its final features were not implemented until the early 1950s.

A small hydroelectric plant at one of the project's dams also supplies electricity to the region.

History

Long before Texas was a state, the Pueblo Indians used the waters of the Rio Grande with simple irrigation systems that were noted by the Spanish in the 16th century while conducting expeditions from Mexico to North America. In the mid-19th century, American settlers began intensive irrigation development of the Rio Grande watershed. Small dikes, dams, canals, and other irrigation works were constructed along the Rio Grande and its tributaries. The river would take out some of these primitive structures in its annual floods, and a large, coordinated project would be needed to construct permanent replacements. However, investigations to begin this project did not begin until the early twentieth century.

Like many rivers of the American Southwest, runoff in the Rio Grande basin is limited and varies widely from year to year. By the 1890s, water use in the upper basin was so great that the river's flow near El Paso, Texas, was reduced to a trickle in dry summers. The Newlands Reclamation Act was passed in 1902, authorizing the Rio Grande Project as a Bureau of Reclamation undertaking. For the next two years, surveyors and engineers undertook a comprehensive feasibility study for the project's dams and reservoirs.

Elephant Butte Dam, the largest dam on the Rio Grande, was authorized by the United States Congress on February 15, 1905. Construction began in 1908, when groundworks were laid. Conflicts over the lands to be submerged under the future reservoir bogged down the project for a while, but work resumed in 1912 and the reservoir began to fill by 1915. The Franklin Canal was an existing 1890 canal purchased by the Bureau of Reclamation in 1912 and rebuilt from 1914 to 1915. The Mesilla and Percha Diversion Dams, East Side Canal, West Side Canal, Rincon Valley Canal, and an extension of the Leasburg Canal were built in the period between 1914 and 1919.

In the late 1910s, a problem developed with rising local groundwater levels caused by irrigation. In response, Reclamation began planning for the extensive  drainage system of the Rio Grande Project in 1916. Contracts for the construction of these drainage systems, as well as distribution canals (laterals) were not awarded until the period from 1917 to 1918. Before 1929, the entire irrigation system would be overhauled. This involved repairing, rebuilding and extending old canals; and construction of new laterals. Work is still in progress, as agricultural development in the region continues to grow.

The last major components of the project were constructed from the 1930s to the early 1950s. Caballo Dam, the second major storage facility of the project located 21 miles south of Truth or Consequences, New Mexico was built from 1936 to 1938. Caballo was built to provide flood protection for the projects downstream, stabilize outflows from Elephant Butte, and replace storage lost in Elephant Butte Reservoir due to sedimentation. With the benefit of flow regulation, a small hydroelectric plant was completed in 1940 at the base of Elephant Butte Dam. The construction of power transmission lines was begun in 1940, and was finally completed by 1952.

The Elephant Butte Irrigation District is a  historic district providing recognition and limited protection for the history of much of the system, which was listed on the National Register of Historic Places in 1997.  The listing included three contributing buildings and 214 contributing structures.  Noted as historic are the diversion dams and the unlined irrigation canals;  most of the mechanical fixtures in the system have been routinely replaced and are non-historic.

Components of the project

Elephant Butte Dam

The Elephant Butte Dam (also referred to as Elephant Butte Dike) is the main storage facility for the Rio Grande Project. The dam took  of material to construct.

The outlet works of the dam can release , while the service spillway can release . 

The Elephant Butte hydroelectric station is a base load power plant that draws water from the reservoir and has a capacity of 27.95 megawatts.

Caballo Dam

The dam has no power generation facilities, although it has been proposed that a small hydroelectric plant be installed at its base for local irrigation districts.

Percha Diversion Dam and Rincon Valley Main Canal

. Water from the canal irrigates  of land in the Rincon Valley.

Leasburg Diversion Dam and Canal

Leasburg Diversion Dam is downstream and nearly identical in design to the Percha Diversion Dam. The dam and adjacent dikes total  in length. The dam diverts water into the  Leasburg Canal, which irrigates  of land in the upper Mesilla Valley.

Pichacho North and South Dams
Pichacho North and Pichacho South dams impound North Pichacho Arroyo and South Pichacho Arroyo, respectively, to provide flood protection for the Leasburg Canal. Both arroyos are ephemeral, and so the dams operate only during storm events. The dams were both built in the 1950s.

Mesilla Diversion Dam and Canals

Near its end, the West Side Canal crosses underneath the Rio Grande via the Montoya Siphon.

American Diversion Dam and Canals

Riverside Diversion Dam and Canals

Riverside Diversion Dam is the lowermost dam of the Rio Grande Project. Its service spillway consists of six x radial gates, and an uncontrolled overflow weir serves as an emergency spillway.

Effects

Benefits

Crops grown in the region include grain, pecans, alfalfa, cotton, and many types of vegetables. Power generated at the Elephant Butte power plant is distributed through an electrical grid totaling  of 115-kilovolt transmission lines and 11 substations. Originally built by Reclamation, the power grid remained under its ownership until 1977, when it was sold to a local company.

Caballo and Elephant Butte reservoirs are both popular recreational areas. Cabins, fishing tackle, and boat rental services are available at the reservoir. Elephant Butte Lake State Park and Caballo Lake State Park serve the two reservoirs, respectively.

Negative impacts
Even before the Rio Grande Project, the waters of the Rio Grande were already overtaxed by human development in the region. At the end of the 19th century, there were some 925 diversions of the river in the state of Colorado alone. In 1896, it was affirmed by the United States Geological Survey (USGS) that the river's flow was decreasing by  annually. The river has run dry many times since the 1950s at Big Bend National Park. At El Paso, Texas, the river is non-existent for much of the year. Tributaries of the river, both on the Mexican and American sides, have been diverted heavily for irrigation. The Rio Grande is said to be "one of the most stressed river basins in the world". In 2001, the river failed to reach the Gulf of Mexico but instead ended  from the shore behind a sandbar, "not with a roar but with a whimper in the sand".

The river's decreasing flow has posed problems for international security. In the past, the river was wide, deep and fast-flowing in its section through Texas, where it forms a large section of the Mexico–United States border. Illegal immigrants once had to swim across the river at the border, but with the river so low immigrants need only wade across for most of the year. Other than extensive diversions, exotic introduced, fast-growing and water-consuming plants, such as water hyacinth and hydrilla, are also leading to reduced flows. The United States government has recently attempted to slow or stop the progress of these weeds by introducing insects and fish that feed on the invasive plants.

See also
Colorado River Storage Project
Rio Grande Rectification Project
Rio Grande dams and diversions

References

External links
Rio Grande Project History
Allocation of the Rio Grande

Rio Grande
Dams in New Mexico
Engineering projects
History of the American West
United States Bureau of Reclamation
1905 establishments in the United States